Massachusetts House of Representatives' 9th Middlesex district in the United States is one of 160 legislative districts included in the lower house of the Massachusetts General Court. It covers part of Middlesex County. Democrat Tom Stanley of Waltham has represented the district since 2001.

Locales represented
The district includes the following localities:
 Lincoln
 part of Waltham

The current district geographic boundary overlaps with that of the Massachusetts Senate's 3rd Middlesex district.

Former locale
The district previously covered part of Cambridge, circa 1872.

Representatives
 Thomas L. French, circa 1858 
 James G. Moore, circa 1858 
 Joseph Crafts, circa 1859 
 Josiah Rutter, circa 1859 
 Daniel Lake Milliken, circa 1888 
 William A. Wilde, circa 1888 
 William H. Hannagan, circa 1920 
 Charles T. Kelleher, circa 1951 
 John F. Cusack, circa 1975 
 Thomas M. Stanley, 2001-current

See also
 List of Massachusetts House of Representatives elections
 List of Massachusetts General Courts
 List of former districts of the Massachusetts House of Representatives
 Other Middlesex County districts of the Massachusetts House of Representatives: 1st, 2nd, 3rd, 4th, 5th, 6th, 7th, 8th, 10th, 11th, 12th, 13th, 14th, 15th, 16th, 17th, 18th, 19th, 20th, 21st, 22nd, 23rd, 24th, 25th, 26th, 27th, 28th, 29th, 30th, 31st, 32nd, 33rd, 34th, 35th, 36th, 37th

References

External links
 Ballotpedia
  (State House district information based on U.S. Census Bureau's American Community Survey).
 League of Women Voters of Waltham

House
Government of Middlesex County, Massachusetts